Tanya Levin (b. 25 August, 1971) is a social worker and writer. A former Hillsong Church member, she has described herself as a feminist and an atheist since at least 2010.

Levin has published two books. The first, People In Glass Houses, is an exposé of the Hillsong Church, in which Levin was raised. It was short-listed for the 2007 Walkley Non-fiction Book Award. The second book, Crimwife, is about her relationship with a criminal. She is also the host of the 2021 podcast Leaving Hillsong, which interviews people who have left the Hillsong Church, and also Reading Hillsong, also released in 2021.

Arrest
On 1 July 2015, Levin was arrested for trespass during an interview, after failing to "move on" from Hillsong Conference in Sydney Olympic Park at the direction of police. The arrest came amid increased media scrutiny of the conference, after organisers misled the media about the involvement of Mark Driscoll. According to Levin, she was convicted but on appeal "the findings were upheld, but the convictions were dismissed."

Bibliography
People in Glass Houses: An Insider's Story of a Life in and out of Hillsong (2007)
Crimwife: An Insider's Account of Love behind Bars (2012)

References

1971 births
Australian women writers
Australian writers
Australian atheists
Australian former Christians
Former Protestants
Living people
Hillsong Church
South African emigrants to Australia